Susanne Gogl-Walli (born 5 May 1996) is an Austrian athlete. She competed in the women's 400 metres event at the 2020 Summer Olympics, advancing to the semi-final heat.

References

External links
 

1996 births
Living people
Austrian female sprinters
Athletes (track and field) at the 2020 Summer Olympics
Olympic athletes of Austria
Place of birth missing (living people)
Olympic female sprinters
Athletes (track and field) at the 2015 European Games
European Games gold medalists for Austria
European Games medalists in athletics
20th-century Austrian women
21st-century Austrian women